Colvin is a surname, and may refer to:

 Addison B. Colvin (1858–1939), American banker and politician
 Andrew Colvin, Commissioner of the Australian Federal Police
 Andrew J. Colvin (1808–1889), New York lawyer and politician
 Bobby Colvin (1876–1940), Scottish footballer (Liverpool FC)
 Clare Colvin, British writer, daughter of Ian Colvin
 Claudette Colvin (born 1939), American activist for African American rights
 D. Leigh Colvin (1880–1959), American politician, active in the temperance movement
 Dora Colvin, American trucker, pioneering woman in the occupation
 Douglas Glenn Colvin (1951–2002), real name of American musician Dee Dee Ramone
 Edwin A. Colvin, American politician
 Elliott Graham Colvin, Meerut's Commissioner in the early 1880s
 Elliot Graham Colvin
 Elliot James Dowell Colvin
 Fred H. Colvin (1867–1965), American machinist and writer
 Harvey Doolittle Colvin (1815–1892), American politician
 Holly Colvin (born 1989), English cricketer
 Howard Colvin (1919–2007), British architectural historian and writer
 Hugh Colvin (1887–1962), British soldier
 Ian Colvin (1877–1938), British journalist
 Jack Colvin (1934–2005), American actor
 James Colvin (1844–1919), New Zealand MP
 James Colvin (pseudonym), pseudonym used by Michael Moorcock
 James Morris Colquhoun Colvin (1870–1945), British Army officer
 John Colvin (diplomat) (1922–2003), British diplomat and spy
 John Colvin (engineer) (1794–1871), built canals in northern India
 John Colvin (politician), Speaker of the South Dakota House of Representatives
 John O. Colvin (born 1946), American judge
 John Russell Colvin (1807–1857), British administrator in India, and his sons:
 Sir Auckland Colvin (1838–1908), British civil servant; founder of Colvin Taluqdars' College
 Walter Mytton Colvin (1847–1908), British colonial administrator
 Kathryn Colvin (born 1945), British diplomat
 Kieran Colvin (born 1992), Gaffer
 Marie Colvin (1957–2012), American journalist
 Mark Colvin (1952–2017), Australian broadcaster
 Mary Colvin (1907–1988), director of the British Women's Royal Army Corps
 Michael Colvin (1932–2000), British MP
 Monty Colvin, American musician in the band Galactic Cowboys
 Sir Ragnar Colvin (1882–1954), British and Australian admiral
 Richard Colvin (UK MP) (1856–1936), British MP
 Richard Colvin (diplomat) (born 1969), Canadian diplomat of British birth
 Rosevelt Colvin (born 1977), American football player
 Sarah Colvin (born 1967), British scholar of German, literary theory, and gender studies
 Sarah Tarleton Colvin (1865–1949), American nurse and activist
 Shawn Colvin (born 1956), American musician
 Sir Sidney Colvin (1845–1927), British critic, curator, and friend of Robert Louis Stevenson
 Verplanck Colvin (1847–1920), American surveyor and champion of the Adirondacks

See also
Colvin G. Butler (1872-1961), American farmer, Presbyterian clergyman, and politician
Colvin family, Anglo-Indian administrators and soldiers

English-language surnames
Surnames of English origin